Him Bahadur Shahi is a Nepali politician of Nepali Congress and Minister for Social Development in Karnali government since 6 February 2022. He is also serving as member of the Karnali Province Provincial Assembly.

Shahi was elected to the assembly from 2017 provincial assembly elections through proportional list of the party. Currently, he is the Minister for Internal Affairs and Law in Nepali Congress led Jeevan Bahadur Shahi government.

References

Nepali Congress politicians from Karnali Province
Living people
Year of birth missing (living people)

Provincial cabinet ministers of Nepal
Members of the Provincial Assembly of Karnali Province